The 2019 Anambra State House of Assembly election was held on March 9, 2019, to elect members of the Anambra State House of Assembly in Nigeria. All the 30 seats were up for election in the Anambra State House of Assembly.

Uche Okafor from APGA representing Ayamelum constituency was elected Speaker, while Pascal Agbodike from APGA representing Ihiala constituency was elected Deputy Speaker.

Results 
The result of the election is listed below.

 Igwe Noble from PDP won Ogbaru I constituency
 Dike Nnamdi Umeoduagu from APGA won Aguata I constituency
 Okechukwu Isaac Okoye from APGA won Aguata II constituency
 Beverely Ikpeazu from APGA won Onitsha South II constituency
 Obinna Chris Emeneka from APGA won Anambra East constituency
 Pete Ibida from APGA won Njikoka II constituency
 Chidi Udemadu from APGA won Ihiala I constituency
 John Nwaokoye from APGA won Awka North constituency
 Johnbosco Akaegbobi from PDP won Nnewi South II constituency
 Uche Okafor from APGA won Ayamelum constituency
 Edward Ibuzo from APGA won Onitsha North II constituency
 Pascal Agbodike from APGA won Ihiala II constituency
 Godwin Okafor from APGA won Awka South I constituency
 Lawrence Ezeudu from APGA won Dunukofia constituency
 Fabian Ezenwunne from APGA won Idemili South constituency
 Timothy Ifedioranma from APGA won Njikoka I constituency
 Ejike Alloy Okechukwu from APGA won Anaocha II constituency
 Charles Obimma from APGA won Oyi constituency
 Chukwuma Pius Okoye from APGA won Awka South II constituency
 Arthur Ifeanyi Chekwu from APGA won Idemili North constituency
 Patrick Udoba from APGA won Anambra West constituency
 Uzoma Eli from APGA won Onitsha South I constituency
 Nonso Okafor from APGA won Nnewi North constituency
 Sonny Fredrick Ozobialu from APGA won Nnewi South I constituency
 Emeka Aforka from APGA won Orumba North constituency
 Emmanuel Obinna Nwafor from APGA won Orumba South constituency
 Onyebuchi Offor from PDP won Ekwusigo constituency
 Somto Udeze from PDP won Ogbaru II constituency
 Ebere Ejiofor from PDP won Anaocha I constituency
 Douglas Nwachukwu Egbuna from PDP won Onitsha North I constituency

References 

Anambra
2019 Anambra State elections